Lake Pleasant is a hamlet in the town of Lake Pleasant in Hamilton County, New York, United States. This community is the county seat and includes the Hamilton County Courthouse Complex. The name is derived from a water body named Lake Pleasant near the community.

In the past, Lake Pleasant was also known as "Sageville", after Hezekiah Sage, who built a hotel and attempted to rename the community after himself.

The government offices are primarily located adjacent to New York State Route 8.

Lake Pleasant hamlet is nestled between the southeast corner of Sacandaga Lake and the southwestern corner of Lake Pleasant.

References

Hamlets in New York (state)
County seats in New York (state)
Hamlets in Hamilton County, New York